Jonah 4 is the fourth (and the last) chapter of the Book of Jonah in the Hebrew Bible or the Old Testament of the Christian Bible. This book contains the prophecies attributed to the prophet Jonah, and is a part of the Book of the Twelve Minor Prophets.

Text 
The original text was written in Hebrew language. This chapter is divided into 11 verses.

Textual versions

Some early manuscripts containing the text of this chapter in Hebrew are of the Masoretic Text tradition, which includes the Codex Cairensis (895), the Petersburg Codex of the Prophets (916), and Codex Leningradensis (1008). Fragments cumulatively containing all verses of this chapter in Hebrew were found among the Dead Sea Scrolls, including 4Q82 (4QXIIg; 25 BCE) with extant verse 5–11; and Wadi Murabba'at Minor Prophets (Mur88; MurXIIProph; 75–100 CE) with extant verses 1–11.

There is also a translation into Koine Greek known as the Septuagint, made in the last few centuries BC. Extant ancient manuscripts of the Septuagint version include Codex Vaticanus (B; B; 4th century), Codex Sinaiticus (S; BHK: S; 4th century), Codex Alexandrinus (A; A; 5th century) and Codex Marchalianus (Q; Q; 6th century). Fragments containing parts of this chapter in Greek were found among the Dead Sea Scrolls, i.e., Naḥal Ḥever (8ḤevXIIgr; 1st century CE) with extant verses 1–2, 5.

Verse 6
 And the Lord God prepared a gourd, and made it to come up over Jonah,
 that it might be a shadow over his head, to deliver him from his grief.
 So Jonah was exceeding glad of the gourd.
 "Gourd": (Hebrew kikayon) unknown exact identity, only found here in the whole Old Testament. Septuagint renders as κολοκύνθη ("pumpkin"); hedera in Vulgate; κυκεών in Aquila and Theodotion. Jerome describes it as "a shrub called elkeroa" in Syriac, that commonly grows in the sandy regions of Palestine. The scientific name is Ricinus communis; kukanitu in Assyrian; kiki in Egyptian; or "cici" in Herodotus, Dioscorides, Strabo, and Pliny;  The Arabians call it "alcheroa" or "alcherva", according to Samuel ben Hophni, Maimonides, Bartenora, and Jerome. It rises up to the height of an olive tree, with large broad leaves (similar to vines or plantain), and "springing up suddenly", as Pliny noted in Spain, and Clusius witnessed at the straits of Gibraltar as "a ricinus of the thickness of a man, and of the height of three men", and Bellonius, who travelled through Syria and Palestine, described one in Crete of the size of a tree. The Egyptians made an oil of it, as the Talmudists called the oil of "kik", which Reshlakish calls as the "kikaion" of Jonah. Also known as "Palma Christi", it produces "castor oil" from the seeds. The plant is used to provide shading.

Verse 11
 And should not I spare Nineveh, that great city,
 wherein are more than sixscore thousand persons
 that cannot discern between their right hand and their left hand;
 and also much cattle?
 "Persons that cannot discern between their right hand and their left hand": that is "children of tender years, who did not know which hand was the strongest and fittest for use". Metaphorically, ones who have "no knowledge between good and evil" and, at present, incapable of moral discernment. If this is meant to include children of three or four years old, which could comprise one-fifth of the population, the total inhabitants can be estimated at 600,000 in number. God who would have spared Sodom "for ten's sake," might well be thought to spare Nineveh for the 120,000's sake.
 "And also much cattle": God preserves human and animals (Psalm 36:6; Psalm 145:9). God cares for the creatures far above the shrub which Jonah is so concerned about.

The book ends abruptly, but its object is accomplished. Jonah is silenced; he can make no reply; he can only confess that he is entirely wrong, and that God is righteous. He learns the lesson that God would have all men saved, not limited to a narrow-mindedness which would exclude heathen from His kingdom.

See also

 Gourd
 Jonah
 Nineveh
Related Bible parts: Jonah 1, Jonah 3

Notes

References

Sources

External links

Jewish
Jonah 4 Hebrew with Parallel English
Jonah 4 Hebrew with Rashi's Commentary

Christian
Jonah 4 English Translation with Parallel Latin Vulgate

04